Alfred Ernest Bentzin (March 7, 1902 – January 6, 1979) was a  guard in the National Football League. He played with the Racine Legion during the 1924 NFL season.

References

1902 births
1979 deaths
People from Watertown, Wisconsin
Players of American football from Wisconsin
Racine Legion players
American football offensive guards
Marquette Golden Avalanche football players